William Hickley Gross, C.Ss.R., (June 12, 1837 – November 14, 1898) was an American prelate of the Roman Catholic Church who was a member of the Congregation of the Most Holy Redeemer. He served as bishop of the Diocese of Savannah in Georgia (1873–1885) and archbishop of the Archdiocese of Oregon City in Oregon (1885–1898).

Biography

Early life and education
William Gross was born on June 12, 1837, in Baltimore, Maryland, to Jacob and Rachel Haslett. His father was German and his mother was Irish; his paternal ancestors came to the United States from Alsace during the 19th century. Following his mother's death, his sister took care of William and his five brothers. He enrolled at St. Charles College in Ellicott City, Maryland, at age 13. In 1853 he returned to work in his father's store after St. Charles decided that he was not suited for the priesthood.

In 1857, Gross entered the novitiate of the Congregation of the Most Holy Redeemer (more commonly known as the Redemptorists) at Annapolis, Maryland.Following the outbreak of the American Civil War, the Redemptorists received permission from the Holy See to advance Gross to Holy Orders sooner than permitted in church law in order for him to avoid the military draft.

Priesthood 
Gross was ordained into the priesthood by for the Redemptorist Order by Archbishop Francis Kenrick on March 21, 1863. After six months of studies, Gross was assigned as chaplain to soldiers in Annapolis who were wounded during the war. He also operated a chapel for Confederate States Army prisoners of war on the outskirts of Baltimore, and worked with freed African-Americans. 

From 1865 to 1872, Gross served in a Redemptorist mission band, which attended parochial missions throughout Maryland, New York, Florida, and Georgia. Gross spent three years in Baltimore recuperating from illness, then returned to Georgia.  He later continued his missionary work in Baltimore and at St. Alphonsus Ligouri Parish in New York City.  Gross then went to Boston, Massachusetts, where he served as superior of the Redemptorist community at Our Lady of Perpetual Help Mission.

Bishop of Savannah
On February 14, 1873, Gross was appointed the fifth bishop of the Diocese of Savannah by Pope Pius IX. He received his episcopal consecration on April 27, 1873, at the Cathedral of the Assumption of the Blessed Virgin Mary in Baltimore from Archbishop James Bayley, with Bishops Thomas A. Becker and James Gibbons serving as co-consecrators. At age 36, Gross became the youngest member of the American hierarchy. He selected as his episcopal motto: "Lumen aeternum mundo effudit" (Latin: "She gave forth to the world the Everlasting Light").

During his tenure in Savannah, Gross laid the cornerstone of the Cathedral of Our Lady of Perpetual Help in November 1873 and dedicated it in April 1876. In addition to erecting several churches, schools, orphanages, and hospitals, he opened a men's college at Macon, Georgia, introduced the Jesuits and Benedictines to the diocese, and established a diocesan newspaper, The Southern Cross, in 1875.

Archbishop of Oregon City

Pope Leo XIII appointed Gross as the third archbishop of the Archdiocese of Oregon City on February 1, 1885. He was Installed on March 31, 1885.  During his tenure, Gross dedicated St. Mary's Cathedral of the Immaculate Conception in Portland, Oregon, on August 1885 acquired the Catholic Sentinel for the archdiocese, and founded the Sisters of St. Mary of Oregon order in 1886. Cardinal Gibbons invested him with the pallium in October 1887.

Gross opened Mount Angel College in Saint Benedict, Oregon, in 1887, a minor seminary in 1889, and a senior citizens home in 1896; and presided over the Third Provincial Council of Oregon in 1891.

Death
After falling ill while giving a retreat for Redemptorist students in Annapolis, William Gross died on November 14, 1898, at St. Joseph's Hospital in Baltimore, at age 61. He was buried at Most Holy Redeemer Cemetery in Baltimore. His eloquence had led him to become known as "the silver tongued orator of the hierarchy."

See also

 Catholic Church hierarchy
 Catholic Church in the United States
 Historical list of the Catholic bishops of the United States
 List of Catholic bishops of the United States
 Lists of patriarchs, archbishops, and bishops

References

External links
 
 Roman Catholic Archdiocese of Portland in Oregon
 Roman Catholic Diocese of Savannah

1837 births
1898 deaths
Religious leaders from Baltimore
Union Army chaplains
Redemptorist bishops
19th-century Roman Catholic archbishops in the United States
Roman Catholic archbishops of Oregon City
Roman Catholic bishops of Savannah, Georgia
Mount Angel Seminary
Burials at Most Holy Redeemer Cemetery (Baltimore)